Santosh Kumar Gulwadi was an Indian journalist and novelist. He wrote seven books including story compilations in Kannada. He was an editor in newspaper Prajavani, magazine Sudha, Vijay Sankeshwar's magazine Noothana and the first chief-editor of magazine Taranga, from 1982 to 1999.

Bibliography 
 Nañjuṇḍa siri : souvenir 
 Gulvadi Venkatarao - Baduku baraha 
 Modala Moggu

Personal life 
Santosh Kumar Gulwadi was born on 2 October 1938, to Ratnakarbhat Gulwadi (Father) and Shashikala Gulwadi (Mother).

References

1938 births
People from Udupi
Kannada people
Journalists from Karnataka
Indian male journalists
University of Mysore alumni
University of Mumbai alumni
20th-century Indian journalists
21st-century Indian journalists
Recipients of the Sahitya Akademi Award in Kannada
2010 deaths